The Vatican Affair is a 1968 Italian crime film directed by Emilio Miraglia and starring Walter Pidgeon and Klaus Kinski.

Cast
 Walter Pidgeon as Prof. Herbert Cummings
 Klaus Kinski as Clint Rogers
 Ira von Fürstenberg as Pamela Scott
 Marino Masé as Richard
 Corrado Olmi as Lentini
 Tino Carraro as Il maggiordomo
 Giovanni Ivan Scratuglia (as Giovanni Scratuglia)
 Roberto Maldera
 Guido Alberti as  Cardinale Masoli
 Luciano Bonanni as Sergente dell'esercito (uncredited)

References

External links

1968 films
1960s crime thriller films
Italian crime thriller films
Italian heist films
1960s Italian-language films
Films directed by Emilio Miraglia
Films scored by Luis Bacalov
Films with screenplays by Maurizio Costanzo
1960s Italian films